APC by Schneider Electric (formerly American Power Conversion Corporation) is a manufacturer of uninterruptible power supplies (UPS), electronics peripherals, and data center products.

In 2007, Schneider Electric acquired APC and combined it with MGE UPS Systems to form Schneider Electric's Critical Power & Cooling Services Business Unit, which recorded 2007 revenue of US$3.5 billion (EUR 2.4 billion) and employed 12,000 people worldwide. Until February 2007, when it was acquired, it had been a member of the S&P 500 list of the largest publicly traded companies in the United States. Schneider Electric, with 113,900 employees and operations in 102 countries, had 2008 annual sales of $26 billion (EUR 18.3 billion).

In 2011, APC by Schneider Electric became a product brand only, while the company was rebranded as the IT Business Unit of Schneider Electric.

History 
APC was founded in 1981 by three MIT Lincoln Lab electronic power engineers. Originally, the engineers focused on solar power research and development. When government funding for their research ended, APC shifted its focus to power protection by introducing its first UPS in 1984.

Acquisition by Schneider 
Schneider Electric announced its acquisition of APC on October 30, 2006 and completed it on February 14, 2007. APC share-holders approved the deal on January 16, 2007. The European Union authorized the merger, provided that Schneider divest itself of the MGE UPS SYSTEMS global UPS business below 10kVA. Late in 2007 Eaton Powerware bought the MGE Office Protection Systems division of Schneider.

Product lines 

The company focuses its efforts on four application areas: 
 Home/home office
 Business networks
 Access provider networks
 Data centers and facilities

Symmetra
APC Symmetra LX is a line of uninterruptible power supply products, aimed at network and server applications. Symmetras come in power configurations ranging from 4 kVA to 16 kVA. Symmetras are built for use in a data center (in a 19-inch rack for example). They include features such as integrated manageability, hot-swappability, user replaceable power, and battery and intelligence modules. Typical applications include web and other application servers, IP based and traditional PBX voice solutions, and enterprise type network switches.

Smart-UPS 

APC Smart-UPS is a line of smaller units intended for home and office use, available as floor-standing and rackmount versions. With the exception of the Smart-UPS Online series (SURT and SRT models), Smart-UPS units are line-interactive UPS systems, running their outputs off the inverters only when the grid power is unavailable.

PowerChute
PowerChute is a computer program by APC used to control the uninterruptible power supplies (UPS) the company produces. It provides unattended shutdown of servers and workstations in the event of an extended power outage. It also monitors and logs the UPS status. Some versions with reduced functionality are shipped together with the UPS units sold by APC, while other versions are sold separately.

PowerChute Business Edition requires servers to be connected via serial port or USB to the monitored Smart-UPS equipment. It provides UPS management and safe server shutdown for up to 25 servers. UPS Network Management Cards made by APC enable UPS management by directly connecting the UPS to the network with its own IP address, avoiding dependence or the need for a server, which is particularly useful in wiring closets where frequently no servers are present. PowerChute Network Shutdown, together with the UPS Network Management Card, enables safe server shutdown by communicating over a network to any network-enabled APC Smart-UPS (those that contain a UPS network management card).

See also 
 Anderson Powerpole, a DC power connector used in APC products for attaching batteries
 
 Smart Slot, a data interface used for attaching monitoring cards to APC products

References

External links 
 
 Schneider Electric
 Technical Comparison of On-line vs. Line-interactive UPS Designs APC White Paper #79, by Jeffrey Samstad and Michael Hoff
 APC Smart UPS model ranges/generations (current and legacy) - broad characteristics and comparisons

Schneider Electric
1981 establishments in Rhode Island
2007 disestablishments in Rhode Island
2007 mergers and acquisitions
American subsidiaries of foreign companies
Companies based in Rhode Island
Companies formerly listed on the Nasdaq
Computer companies established in 1981
Computer companies disestablished in 2007
Computer storage companies
Defunct companies based in Rhode Island
Defunct computer companies of the United States
Defunct computer hardware companies
Defunct software companies of the United States
Defunct technology companies of the United States
Electronics companies established in 1981
Electronics companies disestablished in 2007
Multinational companies
Software companies based in Rhode Island
Technology companies of France
Software companies established in 1981
Software companies disestablished in 2007
Technology companies established in 1981
Technology companies disestablished in 2007
Battery manufacturers